(also known as Nowhere Girl) is a Japanese suspense thriller film directed by Mamoru Oshii. It was released on July 25, 2015, in Japan.

Plot
A strange girl feels that she is out of place in her school. The people around her are also strange. The Russian military attacks the school and she kills them with an AK-74. She wakes up to find that it was a dream, and the school is actually a refugee camp, she is a soldier, and Japan has been invaded by Russia.

Cast
Nana Seino as Ai
Nobuaki Kaneko
Lily
Hirotarō Honda

Reception
The film was panned by audiences, earning 2.43/5 stars on Yahoo Movies Japan and 2.5/5 stars on Eiga.com, with viewers citing the nonsensical story and bad acting as its biggest problems while praising its visuals.

References

External links
 

2010s thriller films
2015 films
Films directed by Mamoru Oshii
Japanese thriller films
2010s Japanese films